The Huygens–Fresnel principle (named after Dutch physicist Christiaan Huygens and French physicist Augustin-Jean Fresnel) states that every point on a wavefront is itself the source of spherical wavelets, and the secondary wavelets emanating from different points mutually interfere. The sum of these spherical wavelets forms a new wavefront. As such, the Huygens-Fresnel principle is a method of analysis applied to problems of luminous wave propagation both in the far-field limit and in near-field diffraction as well as reflection.

History

In 1678, Huygens proposed that every point reached by a luminous disturbance becomes a source of a spherical wave; the sum of these secondary waves determines the form of the wave at any subsequent time. He assumed that the secondary waves travelled only in the "forward" direction and it is not explained in the theory why this is the case. He was able to provide a qualitative explanation of linear and spherical wave propagation, and to derive the laws of reflection and refraction using this principle, but could not explain the deviations from rectilinear propagation that occur when light encounters edges, apertures and screens, commonly known as diffraction effects. The resolution of this error was finally explained by David A. B. Miller in 1991. The resolution is that the source is a dipole (not the monopole assumed by Huygens), which cancels in the reflected direction.

In 1818, Fresnel showed that Huygens's principle, together with his own principle of interference could explain both the rectilinear propagation of light and also diffraction effects. To obtain agreement with experimental results, he had to include additional arbitrary assumptions about the phase and amplitude of the secondary waves, and also an obliquity factor. These assumptions have no obvious physical foundation but led to predictions that agreed with many experimental observations, including the Poisson spot.

Poisson was a member of the French Academy, which reviewed Fresnel's work. He used Fresnel's theory to predict that a bright spot ought to appear in the center of the shadow of a small disc, and deduced from this that the theory was incorrect. However, Arago, another member of the committee, performed the experiment and showed that the prediction was correct. (Lisle had observed this fifty years earlier.) This was one of the investigations that led to the victory of the wave theory of light over then predominant corpuscular theory.

In antenna theory and engineering, the reformulation of the Huygens–Fresnel principle for radiating current sources is known as surface equivalence principle.

Huygens' principle as a microscopic model 
The Huygens–Fresnel principle provides a reasonable basis for understanding and predicting the classical wave propagation of light. However, there are limitations to the principle, namely the same approximations done for deriving the Kirchhoff's diffraction formula and the approximations of near field due to Fresnel. These can be summarized in the fact that the wavelength of light is much smaller than the dimensions of any optical components encountered.

Kirchhoff's diffraction formula provides a rigorous mathematical foundation for diffraction, based on the wave equation. The arbitrary assumptions made by Fresnel to arrive at the Huygens–Fresnel equation emerge automatically from the mathematics in this derivation.

A simple example of the operation of the principle can be seen when an open doorway connects two rooms and a sound is produced in a remote corner of one of them. A person in the other room will hear the sound as if it originated at the doorway. As far as the second room is concerned, the vibrating air in the doorway is the source of the sound.

Modern physics interpretations  
Not all experts agree that the Huygens' principle is an accurate microscopic representation of reality. For instance, Melvin Schwartz argued that "Huygens' principle actually does give the right answer but for the wrong reasons".

This can be reflected in the following facts:
 The microscopic mechanics to create photons and of emission, in general, is essentially acceleration of electrons.
 The original analysis of Huygens included amplitudes only. It includes neither phases nor waves propagating at different speeds (due to diffraction within continuous media), and therefore does not take into account interference.
 The Huygens analysis also does not include polarization for light which imply a vector potential, where instead sound waves can be described with a scalar potential and there is no unique and natural translation between the two.
 In the Huygens description, there is no explanation of why we choose only the forward-going (retarded wave or forward envelope of wave fronts) versus the backward-propagating advanced wave (backward envelope).
 In the Fresnel approximation there is a concept of non-local behavior due to the sum of spherical waves with different phases that comes from the different points of the wave front, and non local theories are subject of many debates (e.g., not being Lorentz covariant) and of active research.
 The Fresnel approximation can be interpreted in a quantum probabilistic manner but is unclear how much this sum of states (i.e., wavelets on the wavefront) is a complete list of states that are meaningful physically or represents more of an approximation on a generic basis like in the linear combination of atomic orbitals (LCAO) method.

The Huygens' principle is essentially compatible with quantum field theory in the far field approximation, considering effective fields in the center of scattering, considering small perturbations, and in the same sense that quantum optics is compatible with classical optics, other interpretations are subject of debates and active research.

The Feynman model where every point in an imaginary wave front as large as the room is generating a wavelet, shall also be interpreted in these approximations  and in a probabilistic context, in this context remote points can only contribute minimally to the overall probability amplitude.

Quantum field theory does not include any microscopic model for photon creation and the concept of single photon is also put under scrutiny on a theoretical level.

Mathematical expression of the principle

Consider the case of a point source located at a point P0, vibrating at a frequency f. The disturbance may be described by a complex variable U0 known as the complex amplitude. It produces a spherical wave with wavelength λ, wavenumber . Within a constant of proportionality, the complex amplitude of the primary wave at the point Q located at a distance r0 from P0 is:

Note that magnitude decreases in inverse proportion to the distance travelled, and the phase changes as k times the distance travelled.

Using Huygens's theory and the principle of superposition of waves, the complex amplitude at a further point P is found by summing the contributions from each point on the sphere of radius r0. In order to get agreement with experimental results, Fresnel found that the individual contributions from the secondary waves on the sphere had to be multiplied by a constant, −i/λ, and by an additional inclination factor, K(χ). The first assumption means that the secondary waves oscillate at a quarter of a cycle out of phase with respect to the primary wave, and that the magnitude of the secondary waves are in a ratio of 1:λ to the primary wave. He also assumed that K(χ) had a maximum value when χ = 0, and was equal to zero when χ = π/2, where χ is the angle between the normal of the primary wave front and the normal of the secondary wave front. The complex amplitude at P, due to the contribution of secondary waves, is then given by:

where S describes the surface of the sphere, and s is the distance between Q and P.

Fresnel used a zone construction method to find approximate values of K for the different zones, which enabled him to make predictions that were in agreement with experimental results. The integral theorem of Kirchhoff includes the basic idea of Huygens–Fresnel principle. Kirchhoff showed that in many cases, the theorem can be approximated to a simpler form that is equivalent to the formation of Fresnel's formulation.

For an aperture illumination consisting of a single expanding spherical wave, if the radius of the curvature of the wave is sufficiently large, Kirchhoff gave the following expression for K(χ):

K has a maximum value at χ = 0 as in the Huygens–Fresnel principle; however, K is not equal to zero at χ = π/2, but at χ = π.

Above derivation of K(χ) assumed that the diffracting aperture is illuminated by a single spherical wave with a sufficiently large radius of curvature. However, the principle holds for more general illuminations. An arbitrary illumination can be decomposed into a collection of point sources, and the linearity of the wave equation can be invoked to apply the principle to each point source individually. K(χ) can be generally expressed as:

In this case, K satisfies the conditions stated above (maximum value at χ = 0 and zero at χ = π/2).

Generalized Huygens' principle 
Many books and references e.g. and  refer to the Generalized Huygens' Principle as the one referred by Feynman in this publication.

Feynman defines the generalized principle in the following way:

This clarifies the fact that in this context the generalized principle reflects the linearity of quantum mechanics and the fact that the quantum mechanics equations are first order in time. Finally only in this case the superposition principle fully apply, i.e. the wave function in a point P can be expanded as a superposition of waves on a border surface enclosing P. Wave functions can be interpreted in the usual quantum mechanical sense as probability densities where the formalism of Green's functions and propagators apply. What is note-worthy is that this generalized principle is applicable for "matter waves" and not for light waves any more. The phase factor is now clarified as given by the action and there is no more confusion why the phases of the wavelets are different from the one of the original wave and modified by the additional Fresnel parameters.

Where G is the usual Green function that propagates in time the wave function . This description resembles and generalize the initial Fresnel's formula of the classical model.

Huygens' theory, Feynman's path integral and the modern photon wave function
Huygens' theory served as a fundamental explanation of the wave nature of light interference and was further developed by Fresnel and Young but did not fully resolve all observations such as the low-intensity double-slit experiment first performed by G. I. Taylor in 1909.  It was not until the early and mid-1900s that quantum theory discussions, particularly the early discussions at the 1927 Brussels Solvay Conference, where Louis de Broglie proposed his de Broglie hypothesis that the photon is guided by a wave function.  

The wave function presents a much different explanation of the observed light and dark bands in a double slit experiment. In this conception, the photon follows a path which is a probabilistic choice of one of many possible paths in the electromagnetic field.  These probable paths form the pattern: in dark areas, no photons are landing, and in bright areas, many photons are landing.  The set of possible photon paths is consistent with Richard Feynman's path integral theory, the paths determined by the surroundings: the photon's originating point (atom), the slit, and the screen and by tracking and summing phases. The wave function is a solution to this geometry.  The wave function approach was further supported by additional double-slit experiments in Italy and Japan in the 1970s and 1980s with electrons.

Huygens' principle and quantum field theory
Huygens' principle can be seen as a consequence of the homogeneity of space—space is uniform in all locations. Any disturbance created in a sufficiently small region of homogeneous space (or in a homogeneous medium) propagates from that region in all geodesic directions. The waves produced by this disturbance, in turn, create disturbances in other regions, and so on. The superposition of all the waves results in the observed pattern of wave propagation.

Homogeneity of space is fundamental to quantum field theory (QFT) where the wave function of any object propagates along all available unobstructed paths. When integrated along all possible paths, with a phase factor proportional to the action, the interference of the wave-functions correctly predicts observable phenomena. Every point on the wavefront acts as the source of secondary wavelets that spread out in the light cone with the same speed as the wave. The new wavefront is found by constructing the surface tangent to the secondary wavelets.

In other spatial dimensions
In 1900, Jacques Hadamard observed that Huygens' principle was broken when the number of spatial dimensions is even. From this, he developed a set of conjectures that remain an active topic of research. In particular, it has been discovered that Huygens' principle holds on a large class of homogeneous spaces derived from the Coxeter group (so, for example, the Weyl groups of simple Lie algebras).

The traditional statement of Huygens' principle for the D'Alembertian gives rise to the KdV hierarchy; analogously, the Dirac operator gives rise to the AKNS hierarchy.

See also

 Fraunhofer diffraction
 Kirchhoff's diffraction formula
 Green's function
 Green's theorem
 Green's identities
 Near-field diffraction pattern
 Double-slit experiment
 Knife-edge effect
 Fermat's principle
 Fourier optics
 Surface equivalence principle
 Wave field synthesis
 Kirchhoff integral theorem

References

Further reading
 Stratton, Julius Adams: Electromagnetic Theory, McGraw-Hill, 1941. (Reissued by Wiley – IEEE Press).
 B.B. Baker and E.T. Copson, The Mathematical Theory of Huygens' Principle, Oxford, 1939, 1950; AMS Chelsea, 1987.

Wave mechanics
Diffraction
Christiaan Huygens